There are over 20,000 Grade II* listed buildings in England. This page is a list of these buildings in the district of Maldon in Essex.

Maldon

|}

Notes

External links

Maldon District
Lists of Grade II* listed buildings in Essex